The Europe/Africa Zone was one of the three zones of the regional Davis Cup competition in 2001.

In the Europe/Africa Zone there were four different tiers, called groups, in which teams competed against each other to advance to the upper tier. The top two teams in Group III advanced to the Europe/Africa Zone Group II in 2002, whereas the bottom two teams were relegated to the Europe/Africa Zone Group IV in 2002.

Participating nations

Draw
 Venue: National Centre, Gaborone, Botswana
 Date: 16–20 May

Group A

Group B

1st to 4th place play-offs

5th to 8th place play-offs

Final standings

  and  promoted to Group II in 2002.
  and  relegated to Group IV in 2002.

Round robin

Group A

Latvia vs. Madagascar

Kenya vs. Georgia

Latvia vs. Georgia

Kenya vs. Madagascar

Latvia vs. Kenya

Georgia vs. Madagascar

Group B

Lithuania vs. Iceland

Ghana vs. Botswana

Lithuania vs. Botswana

Ghana vs. Iceland

Lithuania vs. Ghana

Botswana vs. Iceland

1st to 4th place play-offs

Semifinals

Latvia vs. Lithuania

Ghana vs. Madagascar

Final

Latvia vs. Ghana

3rd to 4th play-off

Lithuania vs. Madagascar

5th to 8th place play-offs

5th to 8th play-offs

Georgia vs. Botswana

Iceland vs. Kenya

5th to 6th play-off

Botswana vs. Iceland

7th to 8th play-off

Georgia vs. Kenya

References

External links
Davis Cup official website

Davis Cup Europe/Africa Zone
Europe Africa Zone Group III